Pchery is a municipality and village in Kladno District in the Central Bohemian Region of the Czech Republic. It has about 2,000 inhabitants.

Administrative parts

The village of Humny is an administrative part of Pchery.

Geography
It lies in a flat agricultural landscape of the Prague Plateau.

History
The first written mention of Pchery is from 1222. A document from about 1228 states that it was a property of the St. George's Convent of Prague Castle.

In 1897, Theodor Mine was founded south of Pchery. The black coal mine was in operation between 1902 and 1935. The eponymous hamlet, formerly a miners' settlement which arose around the mine, also belongs to the municipal territory of Pchery.

Economy
A wind power plant has been operating on a field about 1 km northeast of Pchery since 1 April 2008. As of 2008 it was the most powerful wind power plant in the country. As of 2020, it is the 12th most powerful in the country, and the most powerful in the Central Bohemian Region.

Sights
The Church of Saint Stephen is the oldest monument in Pchery. It was first attested in a tithe registry in 1352. It was enlarged from one to three naves in the Baroque style in 1706. Above the church stands a belfry built in the mid-18th century.

Notable people
Oldřich Duras (1882–1957), chess grandmaster

Gallery

References

External links

 
Wind power plant Pchery 

Villages in Kladno District